The Road Leads Where It's Led is The Secret Machines' second EP, released in 2005. In addition to the title-track, a single from their first album, Now Here Is Nowhere, the EP includes several cover versions, including Van Morrison's "Astral Weeks" and Bob Dylan's "Girl From the North Country," and a new song called "Better Bring Your Friends."

Critical reception
Miami New Times called the covers "haunting," and also singled out "Immer Wieder" as a highlight.

Track listing
"The Road Leads Where It's Led" – 4:01
"Better Bring Your Friends" – 3:09
"Astral Weeks" – 6:04
"Money (That's What I Want)" – 7:07
"Girl from the North Country" – 8:59
"(De Luxe) Immer Wieder" – 7:59

Personnel 
Brandon Curtis – vocals, bass guitar, keyboard
Benjamin Curtis – guitar, backing vocals
Josh Garza – drums

References

Secret Machines albums
2005 EPs